People Might Hear You is a children's novel by Robin Klein, first published by Puffin Books in 1983.

Summary 
Don't ever let them know you're here. 
'Our religion is for every day we live, every living moment. You mustn't ever raise your voice or call out... people outside might hear you...
Frances had a good life until her aunt marries Mr Tyrell. Frances is pushed into a sinister mansion enclosed by unclimbable walls. At first she trustingly accepts her aunt's new life, and tries to be a 'worthy member of the temple'. But as she uncovers its sinister secrets she realises she has to escape .....

Characters 
Frances, the main character, is a 12-year-old girl. She constantly moves from one apartment to another with Aunt Loris, always hoping the new one will be better than the last. Frances is obedient, yet curiosity overpowers her morality at times.
 
Mr. Tyrell, whose full name is Finley Tyrell, is the father of Rosgrana, Claire and Helen. He is intimidating in his ways due to his firm belief of an upcoming war that ends the world. Quite suppressing, Mr. Tyrell abides the laws of the temple so fiercely that he is quite an ominous person to Frances.
 
Aunt Loris, Frances's aunt and guardian, has trouble maintaining her work and has to move constantly, taking Frances with her. Unsurprisingly, she cannot find herself a suitable husband until she meet Mr Tyrell. Her love for him is so strong that she pursues Mr. Tyrell's temple's religion with the hope of acceptance.
 
Rosgrana, Helen and Claire are Mr. Tyrell's girls who have been brought up in the ways of the temple. Rosgrana, the eldest, is extremely faithful and studious. She is often left in charge of the house when Mr Tyrell has to go and run errands 'outside' and makes utilitarian clothes for herself and the other family members, which Frances despises because they are drab and old-fashioned. Claire, the youngest daughter is very devoted to the temple and its beliefs and despises Frances because she feels that Frances is bringing evil 'outsider' ways into the house. Claire often acts as an antagonist to Frances and seems to take pleasure in telling her father when Frances breaks the rules of the house. Helen is the middle daughter and although she holds a strong tie to the beliefs of her family and the temple, an incident with another temple member, Paul, makes her start questioning the temple and its ways. Helen's doubt allows her to feel sorry for Frances and Helen ends up becoming an ally for Frances in the house which is carried on until the end of the novel.

Awards
 Won - Canberra’s Own Outstanding List: Fiction for Older Readers Award (1991)

1983 Australian novels
Australian children's novels
Fictional cults
Novels by Robin Klein
COOL Award-winning works
1983 children's books